Sir Lucius Henry O'Brien, 3rd Baronet PC (Ire) (2 September 1731 – 15 January 1795) was an Irish baronet and politician for 34 years.

He was a man of quite different parts to his father, an intellectual, a Greek and Latin scholar and a brilliant politician.  He entered S.C. at Trinity College, Dublin, on 9th. July 1748, at the  age of sixteen. He became a B.A. Vernon in 1752. Joined the Irish bar in 1758, and succeeded his father, as 3rd. Baronet of Dromoland, becoming a Privy councillor and M.P.

Background
O'Brien was the son of Sir Edward O'Brien, 2nd Baronet and his wife Mary Hickman, inheriting the baronetcy on the death of his father in 1765. He was educated at Trinity College, Dublin and entered the Middle Temple in 1753, later becoming a barrister.

Career
In 1761, he entered the Irish House of Commons as the member for Ennis, sitting until 1768. Subsequently O'Brien successfully ran for Clare, a seat previously held by his father, holding it until 1776. He was then again elected for Ennis, but following the unseating of Hugh Dillon Massy as Member of Parliament for Clare, O'Brien returned to represent that constituency in 1778. In the election of 1783, he became the representative for Tuam. O'Brien was sworn of the Privy Council of Ireland in 1786. He served for the latter constituency until 1790, when he was re-elected for Ennis. He held this seat finally until his death in 1795.

He was elected a Fellow of the Royal Society in 1773.

In 1787 he was appointed a Privy Counsellor and from 1788 to 1795 was Clerk of the Crown and Hanaper in the Irish Chancery.

Family
O'Brien married Anne French, the daughter of Robert French, in 1768 and had by her seven children, three sons and four daughters. He was succeeded in the baronetcy as well as in the constituency of Ennis by his oldest son Edward.

His grandson James FitzGerald (1818–1896) was a prominent politician in New Zealand.

References

1731 births
1795 deaths
Alumni of Trinity College Dublin
Members of the Middle Temple
Baronets in the Baronetage of Ireland
Members of the Privy Council of Ireland
Irish MPs 1761–1768
Irish MPs 1769–1776
Irish MPs 1776–1783
Irish MPs 1783–1790
Irish MPs 1790–1797
Lucius
Politicians from County Clare
Fellows of the Royal Society
Members of the Parliament of Ireland (pre-1801) for County Clare constituencies
Members of the Parliament of Ireland (pre-1801) for County Galway constituencies